Alison Klayman (born 1984) is an American filmmaker and journalist best known for her award-winning 2012 documentary Ai Weiwei: Never Sorry.

Life and career 
Klayman grew up in Philadelphia and graduated from Brown University in 2006 with a bachelor of arts degree in history. After her studies she went on a five-month trip to China with a college classmate and wound up staying to learn Chinese and work. She has contributed to PBS Frontline, National Public Radio and The New York Times.

After meeting artist Ai Weiwei while filming his exhibit for a local gallery, she started shooting footage for a longer documentary in December 2008. Ai Weiwei: Never Sorry debuted at the Sundance Film Festival and won the Special Jury Prize and a 2013 Alfred I. duPont-Columbia Award.

Klayman's documentary on Abercrombie & Fitch focused on the store's success and controversies, including its racist and exclusionary practices. White Hot: The Rise & Fall of Abercrombie & Fitch was released on Netflix in 2022.

Klayman is Jewish.

Filmography 
 Ai Weiwei: Never Sorry (2012)
 The 100 Years Show (2015)
 11/8/16 (2017)
 Take Your Pills (2018)
 The Brink (2019)
 Jagged (2021)
 White Hot: The Rise & Fall of Abercrombie & Fitch (2022)

Awards and honors

Alfred I. DuPont-Columbia Award
Alliance of Women Film Journalists
Ashland Independent Film Festival
DGA Award nomination for Outstanding Directorial Achievement in Documentary
Filmmaker Magazine "25 New Faces of Independent Film"
New York Times International List of 20 Directors to Watch
Sundance Film Festival – Special Jury Prize for Spirit of Defiance
Taiwan International Documentary Film Festival

References

External links 
 
 

1984 births
Brown University alumni
American documentary filmmakers
20th-century American Jews
People from Philadelphia
Living people
Filmmakers from Pennsylvania
American women documentary filmmakers
Jack M. Barrack Hebrew Academy alumni
21st-century American Jews